Mikael Bartholdy competed for Canada in the men's standing volleyball event at the 2000 Summer Paralympics, where he won a silver medal. He also competed with the Canadian team which won a bronze medal in sitting volleyball at the 2011 Parapan American Games and the 2019 Parapan American Games.

See also 
 Canada at the 2000 Summer Paralympics
 Canada at the 2011 Parapan American Games
 Canada at the 2019 Parapan American Games

References

External links 
 Mikael Bartholdy at World ParaVolley

Living people
Year of birth missing (living people)
Place of birth missing (living people)
Canadian men's volleyball players
Paralympic silver medalists for Canada
Paralympic medalists in volleyball
Volleyball players at the 2000 Summer Paralympics
Medalists at the 2000 Summer Paralympics
Medalists at the 2011 Parapan American Games
Medalists at the 2019 Parapan American Games
Paralympic volleyball players of Canada